André Ekyan (born André Echkyan; October 24, 1907, Meudon - August 1972, Alicante, Spain) was a French jazz reedist.

Ekyan was the leader of a jazz ensemble at the club Le Perroquet in Paris late in the 1920s. in the 1930s, he played with Jack Hylton, Gregor, and Tommy Dorsey, and recorded with Django Reinhardt for several years. Other associations include work with Tommy Benford, Jacques Butler, Benny Carter, Frank Goudie, Coleman Hawkins, Mezz Mezzrow, Bobby Nichols, Joe Turner, and Ray Ventura.

Filmography

Sources 
Michel Laplace, "André Ekyan". The New Grove Dictionary of Jazz, 2nd edition, ed. Barry Kernfeld.

1907 births
1972 deaths
French jazz clarinetists
French jazz saxophonists
Male saxophonists
French jazz bandleaders
People from Meudon
20th-century saxophonists
20th-century French male musicians
French male jazz musicians